The Europa trilogy is an experimental film trilogy created by Danish writers Lars von Trier and Niels Vørsel, comprising his three feature films The Element of Crime (1984), Epidemic (1987) and Europa (1991).

Each films set in different locations of Europe, and are not a narrative trilogy but rather are linked by common themes and stylistic explorations. The overarching subject of the trilogy may be taken to be the social crises and traumas of Europe in the future. Each of the three films follows a character whose idealistic actions ultimately perpetuate the very problem he seeks to solve. Von Trier's later USA - Land of Opportunities Trilogy also deals with both apparent social collapse, and the ill-effects of the interventions of idealistic individuals. The trilogy also experiments with film noir conventions, and explores hypnosis and the relationship between reality and unreality.

The first and third films received largely positive reviews and garnered numerous awards including Vulcan Award twice, while the second received mixed reviews.

Films

The Element of Crime 
Von Trier's first film is The Element of Crime, a 1984 crime drama film with elements of dystopian and neo-noir genres set in a decaying Cairo, Egypt. Michael Elphick portrays Fisher, a detective who has become an expatriate living in Cairo, undergoes hypnosis in order to recall his last case.

Epidemic 
Von Trier's second film is Epidemic, a 1987 horror film with elements of black comedy, medical thriller, and metafiction set in Copenhagen, Denmark. Von Trier and Niels Vørsel portray themselves as two of the three protagonists who write a new script about an epidemic: the outbreak of a plague-like disease. Last of the three protagonist is a doctor, Mesmer, who portrays von Trier himself, goes to the countryside to find a cure.

Europa 
Von Trier's third film is Europa (known as Zentropa to North American release due to similarities to the title of 1990 film Europa Europa), a 1991 anti-war film with elements of psychological drama and romance set in US-occupied Germany after the end of World War II. Jean-Marc Barr portrays Leopold Kessler, an idealistic German-American who takes on work as a sleeping-car conductor for the Zentropa railway network, falls in love with a femme fatale (Barbara Sukowa portrays Katharina Hartmann), and becomes embroiled in a pro-Nazi terrorist conspiracy.

Collaborations 
Due to lack of collaborations in his first film, Von Trier himself and Leif Magnusson are the only two actors who appeared in all films. Among others, Von Trier's ex-wife Cecilia Holbek and frequent collaborator Udo Kier also appeared in the latter two films.

Reception

Critical response

Awards

Legacy 
Europa trilogy was officially collected as a part of The Criterion Collection on January 17, 2023.

References

Notes

Further reading
 

Danish film series
Lars von Trier
Trilogies